Tore Lennart Karlsson (3 December 1924 – 20 February 2003) was a Swedish boxer. He competed in the middleweight event at the 1948 Summer Olympics and was eliminated in the first bout.

References

External links
 

1924 births
2003 deaths
Swedish male boxers
Olympic boxers of Sweden
Boxers at the 1948 Summer Olympics
Sportspeople from Norrköping
Middleweight boxers
20th-century Swedish people